Brandchannel is a website about branding that launched in 2001 with the goal of offering a global perspective on brands. Brandchannel offers a platform that features newsfeed, articles, global conference listings, industry debates, a directory of agencies, and other branding resources. The website was produced by Interbrand, but currently maintained byeditorial independence. Brandchannel is based in New York city.

References

External links
Official website 

American news websites
Brand management
Internet properties established in 2001

Site closed 
The company and its website have ceased to exist, with their Facebook and Twitter accounts showing no new posts since March 2019.